Phyllonorycter tritorrhecta is a moth of the family Gracillariidae. It is known from Honshu island in Japan.

The wingspan is 5–6 mm.

The larvae feed on Zelkova serrata. They mine the leaves of their host plant. The mine is ptychonomous and created on the upper surface of the leaves.

References

tritorrhecta
Moths of Japan
Moths described in 1935